Lachlan McNeil (born 2 September 2001) is an Australian rules footballer who plays for the Western Bulldogs in the Australian Football League (AFL). He was recruited by the Western Bulldogs with the 11th draft pick in the 2020 AFL Rookie draft.

Early football
McNeil played junior football with the South Clare Demons in the North Eastern Football League, beginning in the under 14s division and playing a total of 47 games over 4 seasons. He played for the Woodville-West Torrens junior divisions in 2019, where he was selected in the South Australia Under 18s state squad in the 2019 AFL Under 18 Championships. He was named as one of the best players for South Australia in Rounds 2 and 5.

During his time with the South Australian team, he played the majority of his time as a ruck-rover. McNeil played all games with Woodville-West Torrens' senior team in the 2020 SANFL season, kicking 6 goals, averaging 18.6 disposals and 2.6 clearances a game. McNeil was named a s a breakthrough player in the SANFL in April 2020, after his coach Jade Sheedy named him as an impressive player.

AFL career
On his debut, he kicked a goal and tallied 9 disposals and a mark. It was revealed McNeil signed a two-year contract extension with the team on 16 June 2021, tying him to the club until the end of 2023.

Statistics
 Statistics are correct to the end of round 9, 2021.

|- style="background-color: #EAEAEA"
! scope="row" style="text-align:center" | 2021
|
| 30 || 9 || 6 || 7 || 46 || 38 || 84 || 14 || 15 || 0.7 || 0.8 || 5.1 || 4.2 || 9.3 || 1.6 || 1.7
|- class="sortbottom"
! colspan=3| Career
! 9
! 6
! 7
! 46
! 38
! 84
! 14
! 15
! 0.7
! 0.8
! 5.1
! 4.2
! 9.3
! 1.6
! 1.7
|}

References

External links

2001 births
Living people
Western Bulldogs players
Sportsmen from South Australia
Australian rules footballers from South Australia
Woodville-West Torrens Football Club players